Island Girl (Finnish: Saariston tyttö) is a 1953 Finnish romance film directed by Roland af Hällström and starring Mirja Mane, Leif Wager and Henake Schubak.

Cast
 Mirja Mane as Liisa
 Leif Wager as Antti
 Henake Schubak as Peter
 Sirkka Saarnio as Maija
 Anton Soini as Masa (accordion player)
 Toivo Hämeranta as Simeon
 Elvi Saarnio as Martta 
 Joel Asikainen as Gentleman buying fish
 Saara Ranin as Hanna
 Irja Kuusla as Saara
 Ale Porkka as Mikko
 Enok Väänänen as Lennu
 Matti Aulos as Coast Guard captain

References

Bibliography 
 Tad Bentley Hammer. International film prizes: an encyclopedia. Garland, 1991.

External links 
 

1953 films
1950s romance films
1950s Finnish-language films
Films directed by Roland af Hällström
Finnish romance films
Finnish black-and-white films